Julien Desprès (born 12 May 1983 in Clamart) is a French rower. He competed at the 2008 Summer Olympics, where he won a bronze medal in Coxless four. In 2010, he won the gold medal at the world rowing championship at Lake Karapiro in New Zealand, rowing in the coxless four, with Jean-Baptiste Macquet, Dorian Mortelette and Germain Chardin. Julien Desprès studied at EM Lyon Business School.

References 

 Bio on results.beijing2008.cn

1983 births
Living people
People from Clamart
Emlyon Business School alumni
French male rowers
Olympic bronze medalists for France
Olympic rowers of France
Rowers at the 2008 Summer Olympics
Olympic medalists in rowing
Medalists at the 2008 Summer Olympics
World Rowing Championships medalists for France
European Rowing Championships medalists
Sportspeople from Hauts-de-Seine
21st-century French people